The 2000–01 UEFA Champions League was the 46th season of the UEFA Champions League, UEFA's premier European club football tournament, and the ninth since it was rebranded from the "European Champion Clubs' Cup" or "European Cup". The competition was won by Bayern Munich (first title since 1976), who beat Valencia 5–4 on penalties after a 1–1 draw after extra time. It was their first UEFA Champions League title, and their fourth European Cup title overall, it was Valencia's second consecutive final defeat, losing to Real Madrid in the previous season. The knockout phase saw Bayern eliminate the preceding two Champions League winners, Manchester United and Real Madrid, winning all four games in the process. Valencia, meanwhile, defeated English sides Arsenal and Leeds United in the knockout phase en route to the final.

The 2001 final saw the two previous seasons' losing finalists clash, Bayern Munich lost to Manchester United in the 1999 final and Valencia lost to Real Madrid in the 2000 final.

Real Madrid were the defending champions, but were eliminated by eventual winners Bayern Munich in the semi-finals.

Association team allocation
A total of 72 teams participated in the 2000–01 Champions League, from 48 of 51 UEFA associations. Liechtenstein (who don't have their own league) as well as Andorra and San Marino were not admitted.

Below is the qualification scheme for the 2000–01 UEFA Champions League:
Associations 1–3 each have four teams qualify
Associations 4–6 each have three teams qualify
Associations 7–15 each have two teams qualify
Associations 16–49 each have one team qualify (except Liechtenstein)

Association ranking
Countries are allocated places according to their 1999 UEFA league coefficient, which takes into account their performance in European competitions from 1994–95 to 1998–99.

Distribution
The title holders Real Madrid finished 5th in domestic league. As a result, La Liga 4th-placed team Zaragoza were demoted to UEFA Cup and their Champions League Third qualifying round spot was vacated. The following changes to the default access list are made:
The champions of association 16 (Switzerland) are promoted from the second qualifying round to the third qualifying round.
The champions of associations 27 and 28 (Israel and Slovenia) are promoted from the first qualifying round to the second qualifying round.

Participants
League positions of the previous season shown in parentheses (TH: Champions League title holders).

Round and draw dates
The schedule of the competition is as follows (all draws were held in Geneva, Switzerland, unless stated otherwise).

Qualifying rounds

First qualifying round

|}

Second qualifying round

|}

Third qualifying round

|}

First group stage

16 winners from the third qualifying round, 10 champions from countries ranked 1–10, and six second-placed teams from countries ranked 1–6 were drawn into eight groups of four teams each. The top two teams in each group advanced to the second group stage, and the third placed team in each group advanced to round 3 of the 2000–01 UEFA Cup.

Deportivo La Coruña, Hamburg, Heerenveen, Helsingborg, Leeds United, Lyon and Shakhtar Donetsk made their debut in the group stage.

Group A

Group B

Group C

Group D

Group E

Group F

Group G

Group H

Second group stage

Eight winners and eight runners-up from the first group stage were drawn into four groups of four teams each, each containing two group winners and two runners-up. Teams from the same country or from the same first-round group could not be drawn together. The top two teams in each group advanced to the quarter-finals.

Group A

Group B

Group C

Group D

Knockout stage

Bracket

Quarter-finals

|}

Semi-finals

|}

Final

Statistics
Statistics exclude qualifying rounds.

Top goalscorers

Top assists

See also
2000–01 UEFA Cup
2001 UEFA Super Cup
2000 UEFA Intertoto Cup

References

External links

 2000–2001 All matches – season at UEFA website
 2000–01 season at UEFA website
 European Cup results at Rec.Sport.Soccer Statistics Foundation
 All scorers 2000–01 UEFA Champions League (excluding qualifying round) according to protocols UEFA + all scorers qualifying round
 2000/01 UEFA Champions League – results and line-ups (archive)

 
1
UEFA Champions League seasons